is the asteroid with the second-smallest known perihelion of any known object orbiting the Sun. Its extreme orbital eccentricity brings it within 0.079 AU of the Sun (26% of Mercury's perihelion) and as far as 4.487 AU from the Sun (well beyond the orbit of Mars).

References

External links 
 
 
 

Minor planet object articles (unnumbered)
Mercury-crossing asteroids
Venus-crossing asteroids
20080328